Baronio is an Italian surname. Notable people with the surname include:

Cesare Baronio (1538–1607), Italian cardinal and ecclesiastical historian
Roberto Baronio (born 1977), Italian footballer and manager

See also
Baronia

Italian-language surnames